The Gibson ES-137 is a semi-hollow-body guitar which was manufactured in Gibson's Custom Shop Memphis factory as a limited production run from 2002–2013. It was a relatively new design in Gibson's ES line which was not based on a vintage instrument, as many of Gibson's instruments are. The ES-137 is available in two models, Custom and Classic.

Gibson claims the ES-137 is a combination of its traditional semi-hollow-body single-cutaway guitars with the sound of a Les Paul Classic. This is achieved by fitting the archtop with pickups and other features matching the Les Paul.

The format of archtop with a single florentine cutaway has been used by Gibson previously. Notable comparisons would be the Gibson ES-175 and Gibson ES-135 models. The basic body shape of the ES-137 is very close to Gibson's fully hollow-bodied ES-175. Despite the 137 being somewhat thinner than the ES-175, it is not classed as a thinline model. However, the ES-137 does sport an internal mahogany  center block inside the body. This design eliminates feedback problems common with hollow-bodied guitars. The center block also facilitates the use of a stop tailpiece alike the ES-335, therefore eliminating the use of a "trapeze"-style tailpiece found on most hollow-bodied Gibsons.

Notable ES-137 players 

 Matthew Followill (Kings Of Leon)
 Cameron Muncey (Jet)
 Roky Erickson (13th Floor Elevators)
 Billie Joe Armstrong (Green Day)
 Roland Orzabal (Tears for Fears)
 Franny Beecher (Bill Haley, Benny Goodman, Buddy Greco)

References 

Semi-acoustic guitars
ES-137